Diagnósticos da America S.A., abbreviated DASA S.A. and formerly known as Laboratório Clínico Delboni Auriemo S.A.  is a Brazil-based clinical diagnostics company. It also operates a food testing unit, advertising, publishing, human resources services, and research entities. Brands include Alvaro, CientíficaLab, Lavoisier, Delboni Auriemo, Alta, Leforte and Christóvão da Gama.

The company was founded in 1961, is headquartered in Barueri, Greater São Paulo and it is owned by the Brazilian billionaire family Bueno.

The company competes in Brazil with Amil, Fleury and Rede D'Or.

References

External links
DASA S.A. company website

Medical technology companies of Brazil
Companies listed on B3 (stock exchange)
Companies based in São Paulo (state)
Companies established in 2003
Brazilian brands